Henning Jørgensen (born 6 March 1949) is a Danish former cyclist. He competed at the 1972 Summer Olympics and the 1980 Summer Olympics.

References

External links
 

1949 births
Living people
Danish male cyclists
Olympic cyclists of Denmark
Cyclists at the 1972 Summer Olympics
Cyclists at the 1980 Summer Olympics
Sportspeople from the Central Denmark Region